Longhorn is a census-designated place in Bexar County, Texas, U.S.A. It was a company-owned village or town owned by the Longhorn Cement Company, created for employee housing in a distant community far north from San Antonio. It once had its own store, post office and baseball field. Since then, San Antonio has expanded north to completely surround what was company property. The village was vacated and abandoned when the company closed. The area no longer appears on maps, and is totally integrated into the City of San Antonio.

Geography of Bexar County, Texas
Towns in Texas